Halu Bon Darreh (also Romanized as Halū Bon Darreh) is a village in Eshkevar-e Sofla Rural District, Rahimabad District, Rudsar County, Gilan Province, Iran. At the 2006 census, its population was 136, in 37 families.

References 

Populated places in Rudsar County